This article lists past and present Parliamentary Under-Secretary of State serving the Home Secretary of the United Kingdom at the Home Office.

Non-permanent and parliamentary under-secretaries, 1782–present
April 1782: Evan Nepean
April 1782: Thomas Orde
July 1782: Henry Strachey
April 1783: George North
February 1784: Hon. John Townshend
June 1789: Scrope Bernard
July 1794: The Hon. Thomas Brodrick
March 1796: Charles Greville
March 1798: William Wickham
February 1801: Edward Finch Hatton
August 1801: Sir George Shee, Bt
August 1803: Reginald Pole-Carew
July 1804: John Henry Smyth
February 1806: Charles Williams-Wynn
November 1807: Hon. Charles Jenkinson
February 1810: Henry Goulburn
August 1812: John Hiley Addington
April 1818: Henry Clive
January 1822: George Robert Dawson
April 1827: Spencer Perceval
July 1827: Thomas Spring Rice
January 1828: William Yates Peel
August 1830: Sir George Clerk
November 1830: Hon. George Lamb
January 1834: Viscount Howick
July 1834: Edward Stanley
January 1835: William Gregson
April 1835: Fox Maule
June 1841: Lord Seymour
September 1841: John Manners-Sutton
July 1846: Sir William Somerville, Bt
July 1847: Sir Denis Le Marchant, Bt
May 1848: Sir George Cornewall Lewis, Bt
July 1850: Edward Pleydell-Bouverie
February 1852: Sir William Jolliffe, Bt
December 1852: Henry Fitzroy
February 1855: William Cowper
August 1855: William Nathaniel Massey
February 1858: Gathorne Hardy
June 1859: George Clive
November 1862: Henry Bruce
April 1864: Thomas Baring
May 1866: Edward Knatchbull-Hugessen
July 1866: The Earl Belmore
August 1867: Sir James Fergusson, Bt
August 1868: Sir Michael Hicks Beach, Bt
December 1868: Edward Knatchbull-Hugessen
January 1871: George Shaw-Lefevre
March 1871: Henry Winterbotham
February 1874: Sir Henry Selwin-Ibbetson, Bt
April 1878: Sir Matthew White Ridley, Bt
April 1880: Arthur Peel
January 1881: Leonard Courtney
August 1881: The Earl of Rosebery
June 1883: J. T. Hibbert
December 1884: Henry Fowler
June 1885: Charles Stuart-Wortley
February 1886: Henry Broadhurst
August 1886: Charles Stuart-Wortley
August 1892: Herbert Gladstone
March 1894: George W. E. Russell
June 1895: Jesse Collings
August 1902: Thomas Cochrane
December 1905: Herbert Samuel
July 1909: Charles Masterman
February 1912: Ellis Ellis-Griffith
February 1915: Cecil Harmsworth
May 1915: William Brace
January 1919: Sir Hamar Greenwood
April 1919: John Baird
October 1922: George Frederick Stanley
March 1923: Godfrey Locker-Lampson
January 1924: Rhys Davies
November 1924: Godfrey Locker-Lampson
December 1925: Douglas Hacking
November 1927: Sir Vivian Henderson
June 1929: Alfred Short
September 1931: Oliver Stanley
February 1933: Douglas Hacking
June 1935: Harry Crookshank
June 1934: Euan Wallace
November 1935: Geoffrey Lloyd
June 1939: Osbert Peake (check date)
October 1944: The Earl of Munster
August 1945: George Oliver
October 1947: Kenneth Younger
March 1950: Geoffrey de Freitas
November 1951: David Llewellyn (to Oct 1952)
February 1952: Sir Hugh Lucas-Tooth, Bt (to Dec 1955)
November 1952: The Lord Lloyd (to October 1954)
October 1954: The Lord Mancroft
January 1957: Patricia Hornsby-Smith (jointly) (to October 1959)
January 1957: Jocelyn Simon (jointly) (to January 1958)
January 1958: David Renton (jointly) (to June 1961)
October 1959: Dennis Vosper (jointly) (to October 1960)
February 1961: The Earl Bathurst (jointly) (to July 1962)
June 1961: Charles Fletcher-Cooke (jointly) (to February 1963)
July 1962: Christopher Montague Woodhouse (jointly) (to October 1964)
March 1963: Mervyn Pike (jointly) (to October 1964)
October 1964: The Lord Stonham (jointly) (to August 1967)
October 1964: George Thomas (jointly) (to April 1966)
April 1966: Maurice Foley (jointly) (to January 1967)
April 1966: Dick Taverne (jointly) (to April 1968)
January 1967: David Ennals (jointly) (to November 1968)
April 1968: Elystan Morgan (jointly) (to June 1970)
November 1968: Merlyn Rees (jointly) (to June 1970)
June 1970: Mark Carlisle
April 1972: David Lane
March 1974: Shirley Summerskill (to 1979)
May 1979: The Lord Belstead
April 1982: The Lord Elton (to September 1984)
January 1983: David Mellor (to September 1986)
March 1984: The Lord Glenarthur (to September 1986)
September 1986: The Hon. Douglas Hogg
July 1989: Peter Lloyd
April 1992: Charles Wardle
July 1994: Nicholas Baker
October 1995: Timothy Kirkhope (to May 1997)
November 1995: The Hon. Tom Sackville (jointly) (to May 1997)
May 1997: Lord Williams of Mostyn (jointly) (to July 1998)
May 1997: George Howarth (jointly) (to July 1999)
May 1997: Mike O'Brien (jointly) (to June 2001)
July 1998: Kate Hoey (jointly) (to July 1999)
July 1999: Lord Bassam (jointly) (to June 2001)
June 2001: Beverley Hughes (jointly) (to May 2002)
June 2001: Bob Ainsworth (jointly) (to June 2003)
June 2001: Angela Eagle (jointly) (to May 2002)
May 2002: Lord Filkin (jointly) (to June 2003)
June 2002: Michael Wills (jointly) (to July 2003)
May 2003: Paul Goggins (jointly) (to May 2005)
June 2003: Caroline Flint (jointly) (to April 2005)
June 2003: Fiona Mactaggart (jointly) (to April 2005)
May 2005: Andy Burnham (jointly) (to May 2006)
Joan Ryan - 5 May 2006 – 29 June 2007
Meg Hillier - 28 June 2007 – 12 May 2010
Victoria Atkins (Safeguarding) - from 9 November 2017
 Kevin Foster (Future Borders and Immigration) - 
 Chris Philp (Immigration Compliance and the Courts, joint with Ministry of Justice) -

Parliamentary secretaries, 1940–1945
May 1940: William Mabane (to June 1942)
October 1940: Ellen Wilkinson (to May 1945)

See also
 List of permanent under secretaries of state of the Home Office
Under-Secretary of State for Foreign Affairs
Undersecretary

Notes

Home Office (United Kingdom)
Home Department
Home Department
1782 establishments in Great Britain